David Sewall (October 7, 1735 – October 22, 1825) was a United States district judge of the United States District Court for the District of Maine.

Education and career

Born on October 7, 1735, in York, in that area of the Province of Massachusetts Bay that would eventually become the State of Maine, British America, Sewall received an Artium Baccalaureus degree in 1755 from Harvard University and read law in 1760. He entered private practice in York (District of Maine, Massachusetts from October 25, 1780) starting in 1760. He was register of probate for York County, Maine starting in 1766. He was a Justice of the Peace in Maine starting in 1767. He was a member of the York Committee of Correspondence. He was a member of the Legislative Council of Massachusetts (now the Massachusetts Senate) from 1776 to 1777. He was a justice of the Superior Court of Massachusetts (renamed the Massachusetts Supreme Judicial Court in 1780) from 1777 to 1789. He was a delegate to the Massachusetts constitutional convention from 1779 to 1780.

Federal judicial service

He was confirmed by the United States Senate on September 26, 1789, and received his commission the same day. His service terminated on January 9, 1818, due to his resignation.

Later career

Following his resignation from the federal bench, Sewall resumed private practice in York, District of Maine (State of Maine from March 15, 1820) from 1818 to 1825.

Death

Sewall died on October 22, 1825, in York.

Memberships

Sewall was a charter member of the American Academy of Arts and Sciences in 1780. Sewall was elected a member of the American Antiquarian Society in 1814.

References

Sources
 

1735 births
1825 deaths
Fellows of the American Academy of Arts and Sciences
Harvard College alumni
Massachusetts state court judges
Judges of the United States District Court for the District of Maine
United States federal judges appointed by George Washington
18th-century American judges
People from York, Maine
Members of the American Antiquarian Society
United States federal judges admitted to the practice of law by reading law